Operation Sure Win 202 (Vietnamese : Chiến dịch Quyết Thắng 202) was a 1964 Army of the Republic of Vietnam (ARVN) operation carried out with US support. ARVN commandos were transported by U.S. helicopters behind entrenched  Viet Cong (VC) positions, attacking them with shoulder fired rockets and flame throwers. Sniper teams then tracked the fleeing rebels and engaged them.

Background
On 26 April ARVN and U.S. Army and Marine Corps officers met in Pleiku to plan a helicopter assault on the VC Do Xa stronghold on the northern border of II Corps.

Operation
On the morning of 27 April Republic of Vietnam Air Force (RVNAF) A-1 Skyraiders conducted preparatory airstrikes on the two landing zones following which U.S. Army UH-1B helicopter gunships conducted a reconnaissance of the landing zones and were met by VC machine gun fire at LZ Bravo. The UH-1Bs engaged the machine guns until they ran out of munitions and returned to base to refuel and rearm and further airstrikes were called in. One A-1 was hit by 0.51 cal machine gun fire and crashed  from Quảng Ngãi Airfield. The airstrikes continued until 12:25 when the transport helicopters began their landing but the VC remained active around LZ Bravo hitting many of the UH-34Ds, forcing one to crash-land in the LZ. The second wave was delayed to allow further airstrikes and only resumed at 13:55 but the VC continued to fire on the LZ and approaching helicopters hitting one RVNAF UH-34 and forcing it to crash-land. With more ARVN forces now on the ground they were able to push back to VC machine-gunners from LZ Bravo, however the VC had hit 15 of the 19 Marine helicopters and only 11 Marine and RVNAF helicopters remained airworthy at the end of the day. The following morning HMM-364 landed the last ARVN forces at LZ Bravo. On 28 April an HMM-364 UH-34 was caught in rotor wash while landing at Quảng Ngãi Airfield and crashed into a canal being totally written off. On 29 April an aircraft recovery team flew to LZ Bravo to assess the two shot down UH-34s, however both were deemed beyond repair and were destroyed.

Aftermath
The one-month-long operation ended with heavy damage to the VC communications line that linked Do Xa with other VC controlled provinces, and forced a critical regrouping of the estimated nine hundred remaining VC fighters there.

References

External links
Do Xa Campaign

Quyet Thang 202
United States Marine Corps in the Vietnam War
Battles and operations of the Vietnam War in 1964
History of Kon Tum Province
History of Quảng Ngãi province